Valery Shary (born 2 January 1947) is a former Belarusian weightlifter and Olympic champion who competed for the Soviet Union.

Biography
He was born in Chervyen.

Shary won a gold medal at the 1976 Summer Olympics in Montreal in light-heavyweight weightlifting, setting an Olympic record in the process.  He also won the 1975 and 1976 World Championships in the same weight class.

Dr. George Eisen of Nazareth College included Shary on his list of Jewish Olympic Medalists (though he acknowledges that he may have included non-Jews). Eisen's list has been published and used in numerous other academia on Jews and Sports

See also
List of select Jewish weightlifters

References

External links

1947 births
Living people
People from Chervyen
Belarusian male weightlifters
Russian male weightlifters
Soviet male weightlifters
Olympic weightlifters of the Soviet Union
Weightlifters at the 1972 Summer Olympics
Weightlifters at the 1976 Summer Olympics
Olympic gold medalists for the Soviet Union
Olympic medalists in weightlifting
Medalists at the 1976 Summer Olympics
Sportspeople from Minsk Region